The Chessmaster 3000 is a 1991 video game published by The Software Toolworks and the third installment of the Chessmaster series.

Gameplay
The Chessmaster 3000 is a game in which the computer opponents range in skill from Novice to Chessmaster.

Reception
Computer Gaming World in 1992 reported that Chessmaster 3000 had added "a lot" to its predecessors, with new tutorial features and a variety of computer opponents making the game "a truly impressive sequel".

Chessmaster 3000 was named the 40th best computer game ever by PC Gamer UK in 1997. The editors wrote that "it remains [...] the premier PC chess title, with just the right balance of fancy game options and high-end gameplay. ChessMaster 3000 runs much faster than subsequent versions of the game and makes a welcome change from guns and guts".

Reviews
Game Players PC Entertainment
Top Secret - May, 1993
ASM (Aktueller Software Markt) - Jul, 1993
PC Games (Germany) - Aug, 1993
ASM (Aktueller Software Markt) - Sep, 1994
All Game Guide (1998)
Play Time (German) - 1992 May

References

1991 video games
Chess software
Classic Mac OS games
DOS games
The Software Toolworks games
Video game sequels
Video games developed in the United States
Windows games